Aşağı Derecik is a village in the central district of Hakkâri Province in Turkey. The village is populated by Kurds of the Pirosî tribe and had a population of 695 in 2022.

The hamlets of Dez, Dikmen, Haput 1/Haput 2, Seranüs, Sulak, Trafik, Yukarı Derecik and Yüce are attached to Aşağı Derecik.

History 
The village was populated by 32 Assyrian families in 1850, while 40 families were recorded in 1877.

Population 
Population history from 2015 to 2022:

References 

Villages in Hakkâri District
Kurdish settlements in Hakkâri Province
Historic Assyrian communities in Turkey